The Minokok are an indigenous ethnic group residing in Sabah, Malaysia. They reside near the headwaters of Kinabatangan River, in Sandakan Division. Their population was estimated at 2,000 in the year 1991. They are considered a sub-group of the Kadazan-Dusun, as their language (ISO 639-3 mqq) belongs to the Dusunic branch of the Austronesian language family. About 35% of the population has been converted to evangelical Christianity, the remainder are animist.

See also
 Demographics of Sabah

References 

Kadazan-Dusun people
Ethnic groups in Sabah
Indigenous peoples of Southeast Asia